Hemicoelus is a genus of death-watch beetles in the family Ptinidae. There are about 12 described species in Hemicoelus.

Species
These 12 species belong to the genus Hemicoelus:
 Hemicoelus canaliculatus (Thomson, 1863) g
 Hemicoelus carinatus (Say, 1823) i c g b (eastern deathwatch beetle)
 Hemicoelus costatus (Aragona, 1830) g
 Hemicoelus defectus (Fall, 1905) i c g b
 Hemicoelus favonii Bukejs, Alekseev, Cooper, King & Mckellar, 2017 g
 Hemicoelus fulvicornis (Sturm, 1837) g
 Hemicoelus gibbicollis (LeConte, 1859) i c g b (California deathwatch beetle)
 Hemicoelus laticollis (Fall, 1905) i c g
 Hemicoelus nelsoni (Hatch, 1961) i c g
 Hemicoelus pusillus (Fall, 1905) i c g b
 Hemicoelus rufipennis (Duftschmid, 1825) g
 Hemicoelus umbrosus (Fall, 1905) i c g
Data sources: i = ITIS, c = Catalogue of Life, g = GBIF, b = Bugguide.net

References

Further reading

 </ref>

External links

 

Anobiinae